Crago may refer to:

Places 
Crago Observatory in Australia
Crago, Scotland, an island in the Outer Hebrides

People 
Barry Crago, American politician from Wyoming
Patrick E. Crago, biomedical engineer and professor
Prince Crago,'The Crow', Alamannic prince
Scott F. Crago (born 1963), American drummer
Thomas S. Crago (1866–1925), United States Congressman